Brorfelde is a village in the Holbæk Municipality of Denmark

It may also refer to:
 Brorfelde Observatory, an astronomical observatory in Denmark
 3309 Brorfelde, a nearly spheroidal, binary Hungaria asteroid from the inner regions of the asteroid belt